The brick tax was a property tax introduced in Great Britain in 1784, during the reign of King George III, to help pay for the wars in the American Colonies. Bricks were initially taxed at 2s 6d per thousand. The brick tax was eventually abolished in 1850.

Proposal

The brick tax was first proposed by Lord George Lyttelton in 1756. The proposal was perceived as partial since parts of Britain used mainly stone for building and also as unfair since the tax would not apply to the rich as their houses were built almost exclusively from stone. Lyttelton failed to pass the brick tax proposal and consequently started to promote tax on publicans, which (at the rate of 1l per a business license) was calculated to generate considerably more revenue than the brick tax.

The brick tax was proposed and rejected again in 1778.

The brick tax finally passed in 1784 to cover costs of War of American Independence. The reason bricks were chosen to be the subject of the tax was that there had been a significant growth in popularity of the material in the late 1700s.

Development

The brick tax was levied on bricks before burning. To be able to examine if a brick had been taxed, the mould would have the word 'excise' on it which would leave an imprint on the brick.

Brick were originally taxed at 2s 6d per thousand. The tax was increased to 4s per thousand in 1794 and again to 5s in 1797.

To mitigate the effects of the tax, manufacturers began to increase the size of their bricks.

The maximum size applied to the mould, meaning the finished bricks were smaller due to shrinkage while burning the bricks.

The final raise of the brick tax was in 1805 giving the price of 5s 10d per thousand bricks.

The brick tax was finally abolished in 1850, by which time it was considered to be a detriment to industrial development.

Consequences

One of the consequences of the brick tax was that some minor brick producers went out of business, forced to sell their stock to meet tax arrears. It also had an effect on architecture, with many areas returning to the use of timber and weatherboarding in house construction, especially weather tiles to simulate brick work, known as mathematical tiles.

The brick tax caused the price of brick grow, which meant that construction and rent became more expensive.

Until 1833 the brick tax also applied to tiles and pipes. The taxation of pipes led to a lower quality of housing as many households could not afford drainage pipes due to their increased price. Tiles were taxed based on the size and level of decoration, which made people use plain tiles, which were the cheapest. That resulted in a setback of the development of architecture and style.

After the repeal of the brick tax in 1850, we can see an improvement of brick quality in churches and public buildings. Moreover, buildings constructed before 1784 and after 1850 show more ornaments, better design and taste than buildings built during the time of the brick tax.

See also
 Glass tax
 Hearth tax
 Window tax
 Wallpaper tax

References

Further reading 

History of taxation in the United Kingdom
Property taxes
Abolished taxes